Cyerce nigricans is a species of sacoglossan sea slug, a shell-less marine opisthobranch gastropod mollusk in the family Caliphyllidae.

Distribution
This species occurs in the Pacific Ocean and the Indian Ocean.

References

  Jensen K.R. (2007) Biogeography of the Sacoglossa (Mollusca, Opisthobranchia). Bonner Zoologische Beiträge 55:255–281

External links

Sea Slug Forum info
 

Caliphyllidae
Gastropods described in 1866
Taxa named by William Harper Pease